A Good Marriage or The Good Marriage may refer to:

A Good Marriage, a 2010 novella by Stephen King
A Good Marriage (film),  a 2014 American thriller based on the novella
Le Beau Mariage ("The Good Marriage"), a 1982 French film directed by Éric Rohmer
The Good Marriage: How and Why Love Lasts, a 1995 nonfiction book by Judith S. Wallerstein and Sandra Blakeslee